Blake Rock is an isolated rock lying  south of the south end of Mackin Table in the Patuxent Range, Pensacola Mountains. It was mapped by the United States Geological Survey from surveys and from U.S. Navy air photos, 1956–66, and named by the Advisory Committee on Antarctic Names for Joseph A. Blake, Jr., a construction electrician at South Pole Station, winter 1960.

References 

 
Rock formations of Queen Elizabeth Land